The Harriers, Book Two: Blood and War is a 1993 anthology of shared world short stories, edited by Gordon R. Dickson.  The stories are set in a world created by Dickson and are original to this collection.

Contents

 "The Noble Savages", by David Drake
 "Down Among the Dead Men", by Gordon R. Dickson & Chelsea Quinn Yarbro
 "Mission of Mercy", by Christopher Stasheff

References

 

1993 books
Science fiction anthologies